Jean Alassane Mendy (born 2 February 1990 in Dakar) is a Senegalese footballer.

He came to Løv-Ham in front of the 2011. He made his debut for Løv-Ham in the 0-1 loss against Ranheim. Before the 2012 season he signed for 2. divisjon club Elverum where he scored 27 goals on 25 matches and helped Elverum to promoted to 1. divisjon. Before the 2013 season he signed a contract with Kristiansund where he became the clubs topscorer in 2013 and 2014. He signed a contract with Tippeligaen side Sandefjord in 2015.

Mendy signed a two-year contract with Scottish Premiership club Dundee in June 2018.

Career statistics

References

1990 births
Living people
Senegalese emigrants to Norway
Association football forwards
Footballers from Dakar
Senegalese footballers
Norwegian footballers
Løv-Ham Fotball players
Kristiansund BK players
Sandefjord Fotball players
K.S.C. Lokeren Oost-Vlaanderen players
Hamarkameratene players
Eliteserien players
Norwegian First Division players
Expatriate footballers in Belgium
Expatriate footballers in Scotland
Dundee F.C. players
Scottish Professional Football League players